Rebecca Massey is an Australian film, television and theatre actress. She has been nominated and won numerous awards for her performances including the prestigious Helpmann Award for both Steve Martin's The Underpants (Belvoir) and Steven Sewell's It Just Stopped (Belvoir). Her talent caught the eye of Director Rob Carlton who cast her as Lucy Canon in the award-winning TV series Chandon Pictures (ABC), after which she went on to star in another award-winning TV series playing Beverly in Utopia (ABC).

Her work in leading roles with major theatre companies nationwide such as The Sydney Theatre Company, Belvoir St Theatre, Bell Shakespeare Company, State Theatre Company of South Australia, and Griffin Theatre Company has garnered her reviews from highly esteemed critics revering her as a ‘rare performer’ (Time Out) ‘riveting’ (SMH), ‘impeccable comic timing’ (SMH), ‘Excellent’ (The Australian), ‘sexy, strong and smart’ (Australian Stage), a ‘tour de force’ (Theatre Diary), and ‘exceptional’ (Stage Whispers). More recently, for the play First Love is the Revolution, Rebecca was acclaimed by delivering a 'stunning performance' (SMH).

She has consistently performed alongside many of Australia's great actors and actresses including Cate Blanchett (The Seagull), Geoffrey Rush (Exit the King, The Small Poppies, The Alchemist), Barry Otto (in Steve Martin's WASP and in Molière's Tartuffe).

Early life and education 

Rebecca Jane Tregurtha Massey (born in New Zealand on 12 September 1969) is an actress living and working in Australia. She is best known for her comic roles as Beverley in Utopia, and as Lucy Canon in Chandon Pictures: women of some determination but limited skills.

Since moving to Australia, Rebecca has worked consistently with the major theatre companies, including Sydney Theatre Company, Belvoir St Theatre, Bell Shakespeare Company, State Theatre Company of South Australia, Malthouse Theatre and Griffin Theatre Company.

Massey was born in Rotorua, New Zealand. She grew up in Papua New Guinea and Hong Kong, before returning to New Zealand to complete her schooling at St Cuthbert's College, Auckland. After graduating Dux of School, Rebecca went on to study Law and English at the University of Auckland, graduating with Honours. She worked briefly as a lawyer.

Theatre career 

Rebecca's first professional job was in a production of the Crucible with the Mercury Theatre Company (now Auckland Theatre Company). She went on to star in Daughters of Heaven directed by Colin McColl, opening the Auckland Theatre Company after the Mercury Theatre went bankrupt. She was a founding member of Stronghold Theatre company with Peter Evans, whom she married.
After graduating from Auckland University, Rebecca toured New Zealand with an Australian production of Steaming with Liz Burch, Lenore Smith and the late Cornelia Frances.

After moving to Sydney, Australia, Neil Armfield cast her in The Alchemist, alongside Geoffrey Rush and Hugo Weaving. She worked consistently with Armfield at Company B until Armfield's resignation as artistic director of the theatre in 2010. During that time she was awarded a Glug and a Green Room Award for Best Actress, and nominated for two Helpmann Awards for Best Supporting Actress in Steve Martin's The Underpants and It Just Stopped by Steven Sewell. Much of the time in those years was taken up with touring the world with the epic Cloudstreet, Nick Enright and Justin Monjo's adaptation of Tim Winton's celebration of Australia by the novel of the same name.

She has consistently performed alongside many of Australia's great actors and actresses including Cate Blanchett (The Seagull), Geoffrey Rush (Exit the King, The Small Poppies, The Alchemist), Barry Otto (for Steve Martin's WASP and in Molière's Tartuffe), Julie Forsythe, and Jacek Koman. Rebecca opened the new theatre at Belvoir Street together with Catherine McClements and John Woods in It Just Stopped.

Since 2010 she worked with the Malthouse Theatre, the State Theatre of South Australia in John Doyle's play, Vere (Faith), the Griffin Theatre Company in Kill Climate Deniers by David Finisgan. For the Sydney Theatre Company she has appeared in Travesties, Vere (Faith), Perplex, After Dinner by Andrew Bovell (which won a Hlep), Lucy Kirkwood's play Chimerica and Moira Buffini's play ‘Dinner’.

Filmography

Rebecca Massey's film and television credits include the award-winning Chandon Pictures (ABC) which won Best Comedy (AFI, ADG and AWGIES), Best Original Production (ASTRA), Most Outstanding Light Entertainment (LOGIES), and Utopia (ABC): which won Best Television Comedy Series (AACTA), Most Outstanding Comedy Program (LOGIES).

Other television credits include Lowdown (2010), My Place (2009), Stepfather of the Bride (2006), Deep Water (2016). Film credits she is known for are Son of the Mask (2005), The Black Balloon (2008), Accidents Happen (2009), Backyard Ashes (2013), Bad Girl (2016).

Film

Television

Stage

Awards and nominations

References

External links
 
 

Living people
Australian television actresses
Australian film actresses
1969 births